Deepak Bansal (born 19 July 1990) is an Indian cricketer who plays for Punjab. He made his first-class debut for Punjab on 15 November 2015 in the 2015–16 Ranji Trophy. He made his Twenty20 debut for Railways in the 2016–17 Inter State Twenty-20 Tournament on 5 February 2017.

References

External links
 

1990 births
Living people
Indian cricketers
Punjab, India cricketers
Railways cricketers
Cricketers from Ludhiana